

Season 
Inter could line-up notable attacking players, such as the new Fanna in add to Altobelli and Rummenigge. Despite his good performances in Europe the Italian league was disappointed, forcing the club to replace Castagner with Mario Corso.

The coach, renamed God's left foot, was not able to get more a sixth position but reached the semi-finals of UEFA Cup, being defeated by Real Madrid for the second time in row. The side could take part to European cups for 1986–87 season only thank to the fact that Roma won Coppa Italia, leaving a spot for UEFA Cup.

Squad

Goalkeepers
  Walter Zenga
  Fabrizio Lorieri

Defenders
  Giuseppe Baresi
  Giuseppe Bergomi
  Riccardo Ferri
  Fulvio Collovati
  Andrea Mandorlini
  Luciano Marangon
  Daniele Bernazzani

Midfielders
  Alberto Rivolta
  Giuseppe Minaudo
  Enrico Cucchi
  Marco Tardelli
  Giampiero Marini
  Liam Brady
  Pietro Fanna
  Massimo Pellegrini

Attackers
  Alessandro Altobelli
  Karl-Heinz Rummenigge
  Massimo Ciocci
  Paolo Mandelli
  Franco Selvaggi

Competitions

Serie A

League table

Matches

Appearances and goals
Statistics referred to domestic league.

Zenga (30/−33); Bergomi (30/5); Altobelli (29/9); Baresi G. (29/1); Brady (29/3); Fanna (28); Ferri (27); Mandorlini (26); Collovati (25); Rummenigge (24/13); Cucchi (22/1); Tardelli (19/2); Marangon (19); Minaudo (9/1); Bernazzani (8); Selvaggi (7); Rivolta (2); Marini G. (2); Pellegrini (2); Mandelli (1).

UEFA Cup 

First round

Second round

Eightfinals

Quarterfinals

Semifinals

Coppa Italia 

Group phase

Eightfinals

Quarterfinals

References

Sources
  RSSSF - Italy 1985/86

Inter
Inter Milan seasons